Farm to Market Road 1960 (FM 1960) is a farm-to-market road in the U.S. state of Texas, maintained by the Texas Department of Transportation. Its western terminus is at an intersection with U.S. Highway 290 (US 290) and State Highway 6 (SH 6) in northwestern Harris County.  It travels generally to the east, ending at SH 321 in Dayton in western Liberty County.
FM 1960 has long been an artery in Greater Houston, though it has been shortened and re-routed over the years. Once consisting of most of the current SH 6 in West Houston as well as its current northern route, it still traverses 26 ZIP codes north of the Houston city limits.

FM 1960 is also one of the very few FM roads with a business segment, which runs through the middle of Humble.

History
On June 27, 1995, the section west of FM 2100 had its internal designation changed to Urban Road 1960 (UR 1960). The designation of this segment reverted to FM 1960 with the elimination of the Urban Road system on November 15, 2018.

In 2011, the segment from SH 249 to Aldine-Westfield Road was designated as Cypress Creek Parkway in an effort to improve the image of the roadway. Landscaped medians with designated turn lanes replaced the broad open center median originally in place.

Historic western termini
 U.S. Highway 290 near Satsuma (May 23, 1951 – September 29, 1954)
 U.S. Highway 90 (September 29, 1954 – September 26, 1960)
 Farm to Market Road 1093 (September 26, 1960 – September 25, 1962)
 U.S. Highway 59 near Sugar Land (September 25, 1962 – November 1, 1968)
 U.S. Highway 290 near Satsuma (1968 – present)

Historic eastern termini
Kuykendahl Road at Bammel (May 23, 1951 – December 17, 1952)
6.6 Miles east of U.S. Highway 59 (December 17, 1952 – November 21, 1956)
 SH-321 (November 21, 1956 – present) (this extension replaced the section of FM 1008) from Huffman to SH-321

Major intersections

Humble business loop

Business Farm to Market Road 1960-A (Bus. FM 1960-A) is an east-west business route of FM 1960. The road begins in Houston northeast of George Bush Intercontinental Airport and continues through central Humble as Humble Westfield Road to an intersection with the I-69/US 59 freeway. It then continues as First Street before reconnecting with FM 1960 east of Humble.

History
The route follows a previous alignment of FM 1960 through Humble, which was shifted to its present route through the city on June 21, 1978. At this time, the former alignment was designated State Highway Loop 184. It retained the state loop designation until the current business route was designated on June 21, 1990.

Major intersections

References

External links

Precinct 4, Harris County authority administering most of FM 1960
Snyder, Mike. "National panel suggests a new path for region / Urban experts call for local leaders to use transportation to guide growth." Houston Chronicle. Thursday July 10, 2008. B1 MetFront.
Jackson, Kim. "Medians divide FM 1960 community." Houston Chronicle. September 7, 2009.
"Green Medians." Houston Northwest Chamber of Commerce

1960
Transportation in Harris County, Texas
Transportation in Liberty County, Texas